Shaukat Abbas (17 January 1946 – 13 January 2018) was a Pakistani cricketer. He played in three first-class matches for Sargodha from 1968/69 to 1975/76. As well as being a player, he was also a cricket administrator, umpire and coach in Faisalabad.

See also
 List of Sargodha cricketers

References

External links
 

1946 births
2018 deaths
Pakistani cricketers
Sargodha cricketers